Negation introduction is a rule of inference, or transformation rule, in the field of propositional calculus.

Negation introduction states that if a given antecedent implies both the consequent and its complement, then the antecedent is a contradiction.

Formal notation
This can be written as: 

An example of its use would be an attempt to prove two contradictory statements from a single fact. For example, if a person were to state "Whenever I hear the phone ringing I am happy" and then state "Whenever I hear the phone ringing I am not happy", one can infer that the person never hears the phone ringing.

Many proofs by contradiction use negation introduction as reasoning scheme: to prove ¬P, assume for contradiction P, then derive from it two contradictory inferences Q and ¬Q. Since the latter contradiction renders P impossible, ¬P must hold.

Proof

References

Propositional calculus
Rules of inference